Dave Pankonin (born December 1, 1951) is a former member of the unicameral Nebraska Legislature.

Born in Lincoln, Nebraska, he graduated from Louisville High School in 1970. He attended the University of Nebraska–Lincoln college of Business Administration, graduating in 1974. He served as mayor of Louisville, Nebraska and on the Louisville City Council. He has two children, Paul and Stephanie, with his wife, Lori Pankonin.

He was elected to the Legislature in 2006 serving Nebraska's 2nd legislative district, in southeastern Nebraska. He served as Chairman of the Nebraska Retirement Systems Committee and was a member of the Banking, Commerce, and Insurance Committee; the Health and Human Services Committee; as well as the Committee On Committees.
He resigned to devote more time to his family's agricultural equipment dealership and his added responsibilities with Home State Bank in Louisville, due to the sudden death of the bank's president. He was replaced by Paul Lambert in October 2011.

References

1951 births
Living people
Republican Party Nebraska state senators
University of Nebraska–Lincoln alumni
Politicians from Lincoln, Nebraska
People from Cass County, Nebraska
Mayors of places in Nebraska
Nebraska city council members